The Moro Affair is a 1986 Italian crime film directed by Giuseppe Ferrara about the kidnapping of Aldo Moro in 1978.

Plot
Italy, 1978. The days of the imprisonment of Aldo Moro, a Christian Democrat statesman kidnapped and murdered by the Red Brigades. A work discussed and contradictory that outshines the politician Moro to focus on the human drama.

Cast
 Gian Maria Volonté as Aldo Moro
 Mattia Sbragia as 1st Brigadist
 Bruno Zanin as 2nd Brigadist
 Consuelo Ferrara as 3rd Brigadist
 Enrica Maria Modugno as 4th Brigadist
 Enrica Rosso as 5th Brigadist
 Maurizio Donadoni as 6th Brigadist
 Stefano Abbati as 7th Brigadist
 Danilo Mattei as 8th Brigadist
 Massimo Tedde as 9th Brigadist
 Francesco Capitano as 10th Brigadist
 Margarita Lozano as Nora Moro
 Sergio Rubini as Giovanni Moro
 Daniela De Silva as Maria Fida Moro
 Emanuela Taschini as Anna Moro

Release
The film was released in Italy on 20 November 1986.

References

External links

The Moro Affair at Variety Distribution

1986 films
1980s crime films
Crime films based on actual events
Italian crime films
1980s Italian-language films
Films about terrorism in Europe
Films directed by Giuseppe Ferrara
Films scored by Pino Donaggio
Films set in 1978
Films set in Italy
Depictions of Aldo Moro on film
1980s Italian films